Tu Ultima Cancion (Your Last Song) is the 10th studio album released by the romantic ensemble Los Temerarios. All songs were composed by Adolfo Angel Alba, except where indicated.

Track list

Sales and certifications

References

Los Temerarios albums
1993 albums
Fonovisa Records albums